Electoral history of Barbara Boxer.

House of Representatives races (1982–1990)

1982

1984

1986

1988

1990

U.S. Senate races (1992–2010)

1992

1998

2004

2010

References

Boxer, Barbara